Ana María Fontán (13 March 1928 – 21 July 2011) was an Argentine sprinter. She competed in the women's 100 metres at the 1952 Summer Olympics.

References

External links
 

1928 births
2011 deaths
Athletes (track and field) at the 1952 Summer Olympics
Argentine female sprinters
Olympic athletes of Argentina
Athletes (track and field) at the 1951 Pan American Games
Pan American Games medalists in athletics (track and field)
Pan American Games bronze medalists for Argentina
Place of birth missing
Medalists at the 1951 Pan American Games
Olympic female sprinters
20th-century Argentine women